Aziz Abdu Kayondo (born 6 October 2002) is a Ugandan footballer who plays as a defender for the Uganda national football team.

Notes

References

2002 births
Living people
Ugandan footballers
Association football defenders
Vipers SC players
Uganda Premier League players
Uganda international footballers
Uganda A' international footballers
2020 African Nations Championship players
Real Monarchs players
Ugandan expatriate sportspeople in the United States
Expatriate soccer players in the United States
Ugandan expatriate footballers
MLS Next Pro players